Louis Weintz (April 21, 1885 – February 12, 1969) was an American cyclist. He competed in three events at the 1908 Summer Olympics.

References

External links
 

1885 births
1969 deaths
American male cyclists
Olympic cyclists of the United States
Cyclists at the 1908 Summer Olympics
Sportspeople from Brooklyn